Copulabyssia similaris is a species of small sea snail, a marine gastropod mollusk in the family Pseudococculinidae, the false limpets.

Description
The shell grows to a size of 3 mm.

Distribution
This species occurs in the Pacific Ocean off Japan.

References

External links
 To Biodiversity Heritage Library (1 publication)
 To World Register of Marine Species

Pseudococculinidae
Gastropods described in 1997